Sara Burlingame (born  1976) is an American politician and former Wyoming state legislator. A member of the Democratic Party, Burlingame represented the 44th district in the Wyoming House of Representatives from 2019 to 2021.

Career
On November 6, 2018, Burlingame was elected to the Wyoming House of Representatives where she represents the 44th district. She won with 51.6% of the vote. She was sworn in on January 7, 2019. Burlingame is a Democrat. On August 12, 2019, Burlingame expressed an interest in stricter gun control legislation in the United States. Burlingame is the executive director of Wyoming Equality.

She was defeated in the 2020 election by Republican John Romero-Martinez.

Personal life
Burlingame's home town is Cheyenne, Wyoming. Burlingame is married to Jason Thomas. Burlingame is Unitarian Universalist.

References

Living people
1970s births
Women state legislators in Wyoming
Democratic Party members of the Wyoming House of Representatives
Politicians from Cheyenne, Wyoming
American Unitarian Universalists
20th-century American women
21st-century American women politicians
21st-century American politicians